Lhotky is a municipality and village in Mladá Boleslav District in the Central Bohemian Region of the Czech Republic. It has about 200 inhabitants.

Administrative parts
The village of Řehnice is an administrative part of Lhotky.

References

Villages in Mladá Boleslav District